Kenya participated in the 1988 Summer Olympics in Seoul, South Korea.

Medalists

Competitors
The following is the list of number of competitors in the Games.

Results by event

Athletics
Men's 5,000 metres
 John Ngugi
 First Round — 13:47.93
 Semi Final — 13:24.43
 Final — 13:11.70 (→  Gold Medal)

 Yobes Ondieki
 First Round — 13:58.24
 Semi Final — 13:22.85
 Final — 13:52.01 (→ 12th place)

 Charles Cheruiyot
 First Round — 13:43.11
 Semi Final — 13:38.44 (→ did not advance)

Men's 10,000 metres
 Kipkemboi Kimeli
 First Round — 28:00.39
 Final — 27:25.16 (→  Bronze Medal)

 Moses Tanui
 First Round — 28:20.98
 Final — 27:47.23 (→ 8th place)

 Boniface Merande
 First Round — 28:21.84
 Final — did not finish (→ no ranking)

Men's 4 × 100 m Relay
 Elkana Nyang'au, Kennedy Ondiek, Simeon Kipkemboi, and Peter Wekesa
 Heat — 40.30
 Semi Final — 39.47 (→ did not advance)

Men's 4 × 400 m Relay
 Tito Sawe, Lucas Sang, Paul Ereng, and Simeon Kipkemboi
 Heat — 3:05.21
 Semi Final — 3:03.24
 Final — 3:04.69 (→ 8th place)

Men's Marathon 
 Douglas Wakiihuri
 Final — 2"10:47 (→  Silver Medal)

 Joseph Kipsang
 Final — DNF

Men's 3,000m Steeplechase
 Julius Kariuki
 Heat — 8:33.42
 Semi Final — 8:18.53
 Final — 8:05.51 (→  Gold Medal)

 Peter Koech
 Heat — 8:31.66
 Semi Final — 8:15.68
 Final — 8:06.79 (→  Silver Medal)

 Patrick Sang
 Heat — 8:36.11
 Semi Final — 8:16.70
 Final — 8:15.22 (→ 7th place)

Men's 50 km Walk
 William Sawe
 Final — 4'25:24 (→ 35th place)

Women's 100 metres
Joyce Odhiambo

Women's 200 metres
Joyce Odhiambo

Women's 1,500 metres
Susan Sirma

Women's 3,000 metres
Susan Sirma

Women's Marathon 
 Pascaline Wangui
 Final — 2"47.42 (→ 49th place)

Women's 400 metres Hurdles
Rose Tata-Muya

Boxing
Men's Light Flyweight (– 48 kg)
 Maurice Maina
 First Round — Bye
 Second Round — Defeated Mohamed Haddad (Syria), 4:1
 Third Round — Lost to Chatchai Sasakul (Thailand), 0:5

Men's Flyweight (– 51 kg)
 Anthony Ikegu
 First Round — Bye
 Second Round — Lost to Philippe Desavoye (France), RSC

Men's Bantamweight (– 54 kg)
 Steve Mwema
 First Round — Bye
 Second Round — Defeated Rambahadur Giri (Nepal), RSC
 Third Round — Defeated Alberto Machaze (Mozambique), 5:0
 Quarterfinals — Lost to Kennedy McKinney (USA), 0:5

Men's Featherweight (– 57 kg)
 John Wanjau
 First Round — Defeated Laszlo Szöke (Hungary) on points
 Second Round — Lost to Regilio Tuur (Netherlands) on points

Men's Lightweight (– 60 kg)
 Patrick Waweru
 First Round — Lost to Andreas Zülow (East Germany), 0:5

Men's Light Welterweight (– 63.5 kg)
 David Kamau
 First Round — Defeated Abidnasir Shahab (Jordan), RSC
 Second Round — Defeated Martin Ndongo-Ebanga (Cameroon), 5:0
 Third Round — Lost to Sodnomdarjaagiin Altansükh (Mongolia), 0:5

Men's Welterweight (– 67 kg)
 Robert Wangila →  Gold Medal
 First Round — Bye
 Second Round — Defeated Đorđe Petronijević (Yugoslavia), RSC-2
 Third Round — Defeated Khaidavyn Gantulga (Mongolia), AB-2
 Quarterfinals — Defeated Khristo Furnigov (Bulgaria), 5:0
 Semifinals — Defeated Jan Dydak (Poland), walk-over
 Final — Defeated Laurent Boudouani (France), KO-2
 
Men's Light Middleweight (– 71 kg)
Mohamad Orungi
 First Round — Bye
 Second Round — Lost to Apolinario Silveira (Angola), RSC-2

Men's Middleweight (– 75 kg)
Chris Sande →  Bronze Medal
 First Round — Bye
 Second Round — Defeated Juan Montiel (Uruguay), KO-3
 Third Round — Defeated Paul Kamela (Cameroon),  5:0
 Quarterfinals — Defeated Francis Wanyama (Uganda), 5:0
 Semifinals — Lost to Henry Maske (East Germany), 0:5

Men's Light Heavyweight (– 81 kg)
Joseph Akhasamba
 First Round — Defeated Jeffrey Nedd (Aruba), RSC-2
 Second Round — Defeated Sione Vaveni Talia'uli (Tonga), 5:0
 Quarterfinals — Lost to Damir Škaro (Yugoslavia), 0:5

Men's Heavyweight (– 91 kg)
Harold Obunga
 First Round — Bye
 Second Round — Defeated Tualau Fale (Tonga), RSC-1
 Quarterfinals — Lost to Andrzej Golota (Poland), 0:5

Men's Super Heavyweight (+ 91 kg)
 Chris Odera
 First Round — Bye
 Second Round — Lost to Lennox Lewis (Canada), referee stopped contest

Hockey

Men's team competition
Preliminary round (group A)
 Kenya — Australia 1-7
 Kenya — Pakistan 0-8
 Kenya — Spain 2-4
 Kenya — Netherlands 1-2
 Kenya — Argentina 1-5
Classification Matches
 9th-12th place: Kenya — South Korea 2-5
 11th-12th place: Kenya — Canada 1-3 (→ 12th place)
Team roster
 ( 1.) Paul Sewe Omany
 ( 2.) Parminder Saini
 ( 3.) Roy Odhier
 ( 4.) Charles Oguk
 ( 5.) John Eliud Okoth
 ( 6.) Michael Omondi
 ( 7.) Sam Ngoyo
 ( 8.) Peter Akatsa
 ( 9.) Sanjiwan Goyal
 (10.) Christopher Otambo
 (11.) Lucas Alubaha
 (12.) Victor Owino
 (13.) Samson Oriso
 (14.) Inderjit Matharu
 (15.) Samson Muange
 (16.) Julius Mutua
Head coach: Gursharam Singh Lall

Wrestling

4 wrestlers from Kenya participated for the first time in the country's history in Olympics Wrestling event, namely:

 Lamachi Elimu
 Waruingi Kimani
 Maisiba Obwoge
 Kiptoo Salbei

References

Official Olympic Reports
International Olympic Committee results database
sports-reference

Nations at the 1988 Summer Olympics
1988
Olympics